Colonel Gerald Hugh Grosvenor, 4th Duke of Westminster  (13 February 1907 – 25 February 1967) was a British landowner and aristocrat.

Early life
Gerald was the son of Captain Lord Hugh William Grosvenor and Lady Mabel Crichton and a grandson of Hugh Grosvenor, 1st Duke of Westminster.

He inherited his titles 1963 upon the death of his sixty-eight-year old cousin, William Grosvenor, 3rd Duke of Westminster, who died unmarried and childless.

Career
He was commissioned into the 9th Lancers from the Royal Military College, Sandhurst, in 1926. He was promoted lieutenant in 1929, Captain in 1936, and major in 1943. From 1936 to 1938 he served as regimental adjutant and in 1938 he was appointed adjutant of the Nottinghamshire Yeomanry.

He commanded his regiment in the Second World War with the rank of lieutenant-colonel and was wounded in the leg by a shell splinter on 18 July 1944, suffering from attacks of septicaemia for the remainder of his life. In 1947 he was invalided out of the Army, but in 1950 was commissioned as a lieutenant in the Wiltshire Army Cadet Force.

In 1952, he was appointed as an Exon in the Yeomen of the Guard. On 18 February 1955, he was appointed honorary colonel of the Cheshire Yeomanry and on 19 May 1961, he was appointed colonel of the 9th/12th Royal Lancers. In 1959 he served as High Sheriff of Cheshire. He was made a Privy Counsellor in 1964.

Personal life
On 11 April 1945, when he was third in line of succession to his eventual titles, he was married to Sally Perry, who was one of three extramarital daughters of Muriel Perry by Roger Ackerley. They were childless.

He is also known to have ordered the demolition of Alfred Waterhouse's Eaton Hall in 1963, at a time when Victorian architecture was unappreciated. It was replaced by a far smaller, modern house. At the time of the demolition, he was Britain's wealthiest peer.

He died in 1967, aged 60, and was buried in the churchyard of Eccleston Church near Eaton Hall, Cheshire.  Upon his death, his titles passed to his younger brother, Robert Grosvenor.

References

External links
4th Duke of Westminster

1907 births
1967 deaths
4
Companions of the Distinguished Service Order
9th Queen's Royal Lancers officers
9th/12th Royal Lancers officers
Army Cadet Force officers
Graduates of the Royal Military College, Sandhurst
People from Cheshire
Gerald Grosvenor, 4th Duke of Westminster
Members of the Privy Council of the United Kingdom
Sherwood Rangers Yeomanry officers
Deputy Lieutenants of Cheshire
High Sheriffs of Cheshire
Military personnel from London
British Army personnel of World War II
Burials in Cheshire